Aksungur can refer to:

 Aksungur, Çorum
 Aksungur, Osmangazi